Arish attack may refer to:

2015 Arish attack, terrorist attack on 24 November 2015
2016 Arish attack, terrorist attack on 20 March 2016
2017 Arish attack, terrorist attack on 24 November 2017